The Indore - Ajmer Link Express was a daily link express train which runs between Indore Junction railway station of Indore, the largest city and commercial hub of Madhya Pradesh and Ajmer, a pilgrimage spot in Rajasthan

The train has been extended to Jaipur and now it runs as the Indore - Ajmer - Jaipur Express

Arrival and departure
Train number 9655A was departing from Indore Junction daily at 18:00 hrs., and was reaching Ajmer, the next day at 06:30 hrs.
Train number 9656A used to depart from Ajmer daily at 2125 hrs., reaching Indore Junction, the next day at 09:00 hrs.

Route and halts
The train used to go via. Ujjain Junction - Ratlam Junction and Neemuch. The important halts of the train were :
 INDORE JUNCTION
 Dewas
 Ujjain Junction
 Khachrod
 Nagda Junction
 Ratlam Junction
 Mandsaur
 Nimach
 Chittorgarh Junction
 Bhilwara
 Nasirabad
 AJMER JUNCTION

Coach composite
As the train was a link service therefore the coach were attached at back of 59307/59308 Indore - Ujjain Passenger and then from Ujjain, it were attached to the halted 19655/19656 Bhopal - Ajmer Express. The train consist a total number of 17 Coaches :
 1 AC II
 1 AC III
 3 SLEEPER
 4 GENERAL

Link service : 
A total of 7 additional coaches were attached to the train from Ujjain out of which:
 1 AC II
 4 SLEEPER
 2 GENERAL COACH

Average speed and frequency
The train used to run on daily from both the sites with an average speed of 66 km/hour

History
This train was introduced in year 2009 and is the only direct connection from Bhopal/Indore to Ajmer. This train replaced by the Old 9303/9304 Bhopal - Ratlam Intercity Express. This train has also replaced the old 9657/9658 Ratlam - Ajmer Night Express.

References
 IndiaRailInfo.com

External link
 

Rail transport in Madhya Pradesh
Transport in Ajmer
Transport in Indore
Express trains in India
Rail transport in Rajasthan